York University Libraries (YUL) is the library system of York University in Toronto, Ontario. The four main libraries and one archives contain more than 2,500,000 volumes.

History 

The first York library opened in 1961 at Glendon College and was housed in Falconer Hall.  In 1963 the library moved to its own building, named after recent Ontario premier Leslie Frost.

The first library on the large Keele campus was the Steacie Science Library (now the Science and Engineering Library), which opened in 1965, and was named after chemist Edgar William Richard Steacie.

The large W.P. Scott Library opened in 1971. The need to build an appropriate collection in a short space of time was immediate and pressing. Accordingly, chief librarian Thomas F. O'Connell, formerly at the Harvard Library, made arrangements to purchase the entire stock of two bookstores: the Starr Book Company in Boston and Librarie Ducharme in Montreal. An early decision was also made not to duplicate research strengths at the University of Toronto and soon the Libraries owned impressive collections in American history, French Canadiana, and later sociology and psychology. Archibald Macleish was awarded an honorary degree at a special convocation at the official opening of the building on 30 October 1971.

Branches

The system has four branches, one containing two smaller libraries and an archives.

 W.P. Scott Library (for humanities, social sciences and fine arts). Separate film/music and map/GIS libraries are located within. 
 Clara Thomas Archives and Special Collections (named after York professor Clara Thomas), also inside the Scott Library; it contains the literary and personal papers of many notable Canadian cultural figures such as Margaret Laurence, Rohinton Mistry, Av Isaacs, Adele Wiseman, bill bissett, Jean Augustine, and others.
 Steacie Science and Engineering Library.
 Leslie Frost Library at Glendon College, with a significant proportion of research materials in the French language.
 Peter F. Bronfman Business Library.

In addition to almost 150 full-time staff, approximately 40 academic librarians are responsible for faculty liaison, collection development, and research instruction across every major discipline and field taught at York.

Other libraries at York, which are not branches of YUL but work closely with it, include:

 Nellie Langford Rowell Library
 Osgoode Hall Law School Law Library (the largest law library in Canada)

The Archives of Ontario is on York's Keele campus but is not affiliated with York.

Partnerships and collaboration

The Library is a member of the Canadian Association of Research Libraries, the Association of Research Libraries and the Ontario Council of University Libraries, and is a contributor to Open Content Alliance.

Chief librarians 

 Douglas G. Lochhead: 1960–63
 Thomas F. O'Connell: 1963–76
 William Newman (acting) 1976–78
 Anne Woodsworth: 1978–83
 Ellen J. Hoffmann 1983–2001
 Cynthia Archer: 2001–14
 Catherine Davidson (interim): 2014–15
 Joy Kirchner: 2015–

The position has been known by various titles through the years, changing from Director of Library Services to Director of Libraries to University Librarian, and then to Dean of Libraries.

Notes

References

External links

 York University Libraries
 YorkSpace: the institutional repository for York University, hosted by York University Libraries
 York Digital Journals: the journal hosting platform maintained by York University Libraries
 York University Digital Library: the preservation repository for York University, maintained by York University Libraries
 Nellie Langford Rowell Library

Academic libraries in Canada
Archives in Canada
York University
Libraries in Toronto
Libraries established in 1961
Library buildings completed in 1971